Princess Andrew (1885–1969) was the wife of Prince Andrew of Greece and Denmark.

Princess Andrew may also refer to:
Princess Christina Margarethe of Hesse (1933–2011), former wife of Prince Andrew of Yugoslavia
Inez Storer (born 1933), wife of Prince Andrew Romanov
Sarah, Duchess of York (born 1959), former wife of Prince Andrew, Duke of York